Stimson Joseph Brown (September 17, 1854 – December 20, 1923) was an American astronomer and Naval officer with the rank of Commodore. He served as Director of the United States Naval Observatory.

Biography

He was born at Penn Yan, N. Y.  He was educated at Cornell University and at the United States Naval Academy.  He served on the United States Coast and Geodetic Survey, became professor of mathematics (USN) in 1883, and astronomical director of the United States Naval Observatory in 1898.  Having been on duty in the United States Naval Academy since 1901, in 1907 he became the head of the department of mathematics and mechanics.  He was the author of Practical Algebra (1908, 1910) and Analytical Geometry and Curve Tracing (1907; revised edition, 1912), texts for the use of midshipmen.

References 

  
 

1854 births
1923 deaths
People from Penn Yan, New York
American science writers
American astronomers
United States Coast and Geodetic Survey personnel
Cornell University alumni
United States Naval Academy alumni
United States Navy commodores
Burials at Arlington National Cemetery
Scientists from New York (state)